Mark Epstein is American author and psychotherapist.

Mark Epstein may also refer to:

 Mark Epstein, owner of Ossa Properties and younger brother of Jeffrey Epstein
 Daniel Mark Epstein (born 1948), American poet, dramatist, and biographer